The Livamol Classic is a Weight-for-age Thoroughbred horse race run at Hastings Racecourse in Hawke's Bay and was at one stage New Zealand's richest horse race. It is run at a distance of 2040m.

The race is run in October. The weather in the Hawke's Bay's means the track conditions are usually excellent.

The race is the part of the Triple Crown raced at Hastings Racecourse, along with:

- the 1400m Tarzino Trophy which was previously known as the Makfi Challenge Stakes or Mudgway Stakes, and

- the 1600m Arrowfield Stud Plate which was previously known as the Windsor Park Plate, Stony Bridge Stakes and Horlicks Plate.

Many of New Zealand's best thoroughbred horses have raced in the various Triple Crown events. A number of horses managed to win two of the three races and some were beaten into second in the third leg. On 5 October 2019 Melody Belle was the first horse to win all three of the Hawkes Bay Triple Crown races.

History
The race was originally known as the Ormond Memorial and took place on the second day of the autumn carnival until the 1985/86 season when it was moved to the Spring.

From 1991 to 2009 the race was sponsored by Kelt Capital Limited, and in particular the owner thereof Sam Kelt, a strong supporter of New Zealand and particularly Hawke's Bay racing.

1996 would see it gain Group 1 status and the distance changed from 2000m to 2040m.

The growth in prize money was substantial in the decade up to 2008. In 2000 it was worth $250,000; in 2002 it was the equal richest race in New Zealand at $500,000 and in 2004 it was New Zealand's first million-dollar race. The race was worth $2,000,000 in 2007 and 2008, but the stake had to be reduced to $1,200,000 in 2009 as that level was deemed unsustainable. In 2010 the stake was reduced to $250,000, below several major races in New Zealand but still slightly ahead in terms of weight-for-age races.

In 2010, after the cessation of the Kelt sponsorship, the Ormond Memorial name was modified in recognition of Lady Katherine (Kit) Acklin née Ormond who had recently died.

Name
 Ormond Memorial (1955-1990)
 Kelt Capital Stakes (1991-2009)
 Kit Ormond Memorial (2010)
 NZB Insurance Spring Classic (2011-2012)
 The Turks Spring Classic (2013)
 Livamol Classic (2014–present)

Group status
1955-1978 (Stakes Race)
1979-1992 (Group 3)
1993-1995 (Group 2)
1996- (Group 1)

Notable winners
 Redcraze (1955) Who went to win the Caulfield Cup (1956) and the Cox Plate (1957).
 Balmerino (1977) NZ Horse of the Year (1976) and winner of the Rawson Stakes (1976) and the Brisbane Cup (1976).
 La Mer (1978, 1979) Champion mare and 1977 New Zealand Horse of the Year.
 Lomondy (1986) Winner of the Adelaide Cup (1986), Brisbane Cup (1986) and the Caulfield Cup (1986).
 Castletown (1991) New Zealand Racing Hall of Fame stayer and three-time winner of the Wellington Cup (1991, 1992, 1994) also won the Auckland Cup (1992) and the Caulfield Stakes (1992).
 Veandercross (1992) 8 time group 1 winner and 1993 Australian Champion Racehorse of the Year.
 Solvit (1994) Winner of the Cox Plate (1994).
 Xcellent (2005) Champion 3 year old and two time New Zealand Horse of the Year (2005, 2006).
 Jimmy Choux (2011) Champion 3 year old, 5 time group 1 winner and 2011 New Zealand Horse of the Year.
 Melody Belle (2019, 2020) Champion mare with 14 group 1 races to her name. Two time New Zealand Horse of the Year (2019, 2020).

Results

See also

 A list of the winners of all 3 Hawkes Bay Triple Crown events is at Thoroughbred racing in New Zealand
 Hawke's Bay Guineas

References

Horse races in New Zealand
Open middle distance horse races